Xiu is a Chinese language on-line shopping vertical, e-commerce company that operates in the People's Republic of China. Xiu was founded by Ji Wenhong (George Ji) and Jin Huang in March 2008.  Xiu.com sells middle to luxury brand name fashion products including shoes, bags, ornaments, cosmetics and home decor. Xiu.com has buyer offices in New York City, Los Angeles, Miami, Australia, Paris, London, Italy, Korea, Hong Kong and Japan.

Funding and investments

In April 2011, KPCB invested $20 million in Xiu.com.

In August 2011, xiu.com raised $100 million in joint funding from US private equity fund Warburg Pincus and venture capitalist KPCB. This was the largest B round money raised in the Chinese e-commerce industry and secured Xiu.com the top position in China's e-commerce fashion industry.

References

External links
 Official website 

Online retailers of China
Chinese companies established in 2008
Retail companies established in 2008
Computer companies established in 2008